
Year 76 BC was a year of the pre-Julian Roman calendar. At the time it was known as the Year of the Consulship of Octavius and Curio (or, less frequently, year 678 Ab urbe condita). The denomination 76 BC for this year has been used since the early medieval period, when the Anno Domini calendar era became the prevalent method in Europe for naming years.

Events 
 By place 

 Judea 
 Salome Alexandra becomes queen of Judea, after the death of her husband, Alexander Jannaeus, until 67 BC.
 Hyrcanus II becomes high priest of Jerusalem for the first time, on the death of his father, Alexander Jannaeus, until 66 BC.

 Roman Republic 
 The Third Dalmatian war ends with the capture of Salona by proconsul Gaius Cosconius and the victory of Rome.

Deaths 
 Alexander Jannaeus, king and high priest of Judea

References